The Church Street East Historic District is a historic district in the city of Mobile, Alabama, United States. It was placed on the National Register of Historic Places on 16 December 1971. Since a boundary increase on 13 January 1984, it is roughly bounded by Broad, Conti, Water, Claiborne, and Canal Streets.  20 April 2005 saw the further addition of 66 & 68 Royal Street to the district. It contains portions of Mobile's 19th century downtown area and features government, museum, commercial, and residential structures in a variety of 19th-century styles. The buildings range in age from the 1820s to 1900 and include the Federal, Greek Revival, Renaissance Revival, Italianate, and various other Victorian architectural styles. Notable buildings include the Government Street Presbyterian Church, Barton Academy, and the Ketchum House.

Gallery
Examples of architecture found within the Church Street East Historic District:

References

See also 

 Mobile Public Library
 Kennedy House (Mobile, Alabama)

1971 establishments in Alabama
Historic districts in Mobile, Alabama
National Register of Historic Places in Mobile, Alabama
Federal architecture in Alabama
Greek Revival architecture in Alabama
Italianate architecture in Alabama
Renaissance Revival architecture in Alabama
Historic districts on the National Register of Historic Places in Alabama